Güttler or Guettler is a South German status name for the holder of a small farm. It derives from Middle High German güetelin ("small holding"), ultimately from guot "property". Notable people with the name include:

 Günter Güttler (born 1961), former German soccer player
 Károly Güttler (born 1968), former breaststroker from Hungary
 Ken Guettler (1927–1977), American baseball outfielder
 Ludwig Güttler (born 1943), German trumpet virtuoso and conductor
 Michael Güttler, German operatic conductor
 Ryan Guettler (born 1983), Australian cyclist
 Wolfgang Güttler (1893–1918), World War I flying ace

Surnames from status names
German-language surnames